O'Malley of the Mounted is a 1936 American Western film directed by David Howard and written by Frank Howard Clark and Daniel Jarrett. The film stars George O'Brien, Irene Ware, Stanley Fields, James Bush, Victor Potel and Reginald Barlow. The film was released on March 27, 1936, by 20th Century Fox.

Plot

Cast  
George O'Brien as Constable O'Malley RCMP aka Duke Kinnard
Irene Ware as Edith 'Edie' Hyland
Stanley Fields as Red Jagger
James Bush as Bud Hyland
Victor Potel as Gabby
Reginald Barlow as Commissioner
Richard Cramer as Henchman Butch 
Tom London as Henchman Lefty
Crauford Kent as Inspector McGregor

References

External links 
 

1936 films
American Western (genre) films
1936 Western (genre) films
20th Century Fox films
Films directed by David Howard
American black-and-white films
Films produced by Sol Lesser
1930s English-language films
1930s American films